Loyola Sport Club (usually called Loyola) was a professional club. The club has won four First Division titles in the amateur era. The club is based in Caracas.

Honours
Primera División Venezolana: 4
Winners (4): 1925, 1943, 1944, 1948 
Runner-up (5): 1942, 1945, 1951, 1952, 1954

External links
Loyola SC 

Football clubs in Venezuela
Football clubs in Caracas
1923 establishments in Venezuela
Association football clubs established in 1923